Liocheles is a genus of scorpions belonging to the family Hormuridae.

Species 
The following species are recognised in the genus Liocheles:
 Liocheles australasiae (Fabricius, 1775) 
 Liocheles longimanus (Werner, 1939)
 Liocheles nigripes (Pocock, 1897)
 Liocheles oranghutan Ythier & Richard, 2020
 Liocheles schalleri Mirza, 2017

References

Hormuridae
Scorpion genera